The third season of the Syfy reality television series Face Off premiered on August 21, 2012 and ended October 31, 2012. The season featured twelve prosthetic makeup artists competing against each other to create makeup effects. In the finale, they were voted on by the public in a live broadcast on Halloween.

The season was won by Nicole Chilelli of Stayton, Oregon, who holds four Face Off records for being the first female to win, the first contestant to be eliminated and then come back in the same season, the first returning contestant to win the season, and being the only champion chosen by the audience.

Judges
 Glenn Hetrick
 Ve Neill
 Patrick Tatopoulos (three episodes)
 Neville Page
 McKenzie Westmore (host)

Contestants

Production
Season 1 and 2 judge Patrick Tatopoulos stepped down from his position after the first episode in order to work on 300: Rise of an Empire, but later returned as a guest judge for the foundation challenge in episode 7 and in the final two episodes of the season. He is replaced by concept designer Neville Page, who has previously worked on Avatar as lead creature designer, Prometheus as character designer and Star Trek as lead creature and character designer. Ve Neill and Glenn Hetrick remain as judges, with McKenzie Westmore remaining as the show's host. A pair of fraternal twins will compete against each other this season.

Guests that appeared this season include Sean Astin, Brian Grazer, Kevin Smith, Gale Anne Hurd, Matthew Wood, Paul W. S. Anderson, Laila Ali and Barney Burman.

Contestant progress

 The contestant won Face Off.
  The contestant was a runner-up.
 The contestant won a Spotlight Challenge.
 The contestant was part of a team that won the Spotlight Challenge.
 The contestant was in the top in the Spotlight Challenge.
 The contestant was in the bottom in the Spotlight Challenge.
 The contestant was a teammate of the eliminated contestant in the Spotlight Challenge.
 The contestant was eliminated.
 The contestant was disqualified from the competition.
 The contestant returned to the competition.
‡ The contestant won the Foundation Challenge.

Episodes

{| class="wikitable plainrowheaders" style="width:100%; margin:auto;"
|-
|-style="color:white"
! scope="col" style="background-color: #6698DA; width:12em;" |No. inseries
! scope="col" style="background-color: #6698DA; width:12em;" |No. inseason
! scope="col" style="background-color: #6698DA;" |Title  
! scope="col" style="background-color: #6698DA; width:12em;" |Original air date 
! scope="col" style="background-color: #6698DA; width:12em;" |U.S. viewers(million)
! scope="col" style="background-color: #6698DA; width:12em;" |18-49Rating
 
  
 
 
 
 
 
  
 
 
 
 
|}

Footnotes

 Following the judging on the Face Off Reveal Stage, Joe left the set entirely before the Spotlight Challenge's final results were announced. As a result, he was disqualified from the competition with the elimination of the remaining bottom three not needed. Since then, Joe made no return appearances in the season, including for the Foundation Challenge to bring somebody back to the competition.
 Not chosen: Lamborghini Gallardo or Space Mole
 Not chosen: Biffer-Baum Bird or Hoop-Soup-Snoop 
 First of a two-part finale. The winner was chosen in the second half.

References

External links

 
 

2012 American television seasons
Face Off (TV series)